Valmo Kriisa (born 18 May 1974 in Pärnu, Estonia) is an Estonian former professional basketball player. He played at the point guard and shooting guard positions.
Kriisa started his senior club career with "KK Tartu" team (Tartu Ülikool/Rock) in 1990 and after 96–97 season he moved to "Nybit". He spent the 2000–01 season in Sweden with Södertälje BBK. Then Kriisa returned to Estonia, signed for two seasons with "BC Kalev" and won the Estonian Championship titles in 2002 and 2003. On seasons 2003–2006 he played for the Dutch Eredivisie team Hanzevast Capitals. During this period he won the Dutch Championship in 2004. After three seasons in The Netherlands, Kriisa came back to Estonia and joined BC Kalev/Cramo. He spent three seasons with Kalev winning one Estonian Championship. In 2007 he was named the Estonian Basketball Player of the Year. Kriisa spent the 2009-10 season with BC Rakvere Tarvas helping the team to the Estonian league finals for the first time. Though Tarvas lost to Tartu Ülikool/Rock, Kriisa was named the KML Most Valuable Player. In the 2010-11 season Kriisa played for TTÜ/Kalev.
Since 1995, Kriisa is a member of the Estonia national basketball team and was also a member of the Estonian EuroBasket 2001 squad. He is the father of Arizona Wildcats men's basketball player Kerr Kriisa.

Honours

Club
Nybit
Estonian Basketball Cup: 1998

Tallinna Kalev
Korvpalli Meistriliiga: 2001–02, 2002–03
Estonian Basketball Cup: 2001

Hanzevast Capitals
Dutch Basketball League: 2003–04
Dutch Cup: 2005

Kalev/Cramo
Korvpalli Meistriliiga: 2008–09
Estonian Basketball Cup: 2006, 2007, 2008

University of Tartu
Korvpalli Meistriliiga: 2014–15
Estonian Basketball Cup: 2013, 2014

Individual
 Estonian Basketball Player of the Year: 2007
 KML Most Valuable Player: 2010
 KML Best Defender: 2007
 All-KML First Team: 2007, 2010
 KML All-Star: 2004. 2007

External links 

 Profile at basket.ee
 Profile at bbl.net

1974 births
Living people
BC Kalev/Cramo players
BC Rakvere Tarvas players
BC Valga players
Donar (basketball club) players
Estonian expatriate basketball people in the Netherlands
Estonian expatriate basketball people in Sweden
Estonian men's basketball players
Korvpalli Meistriliiga players
Point guards
Södertälje Kings players
Sportspeople from Pärnu
Tartu Ülikool/Rock players
TTÜ KK players
KK Kalev players